Morné Louis Blom (born 25 April 1989) is a Namibian rugby union player, currently playing with the Namibia national team. His regular position is flanker or lock.

Rugby career

Blom was born in Edenville in South Africa, but grew up in Windhoek. He again played for the team since their return to South African competitions in 2015.

References

External links
 

Namibian rugby union players
Living people
1989 births
People from Ngwathe Local Municipality
Rugby union locks
Rugby union flankers
Namibia international rugby union players